Lucie Hradecká and Michaëlla Krajicek were the defending champions, however Krajicek chose not to participate. Hradecká paired up with Andrea Hlaváčková as the top seeds and went on to win the tournament, defeating Katarzyna Piter and Maryna Zanevska in the final, 6–1, 7–5.

Seeds

Draw

References 
 Draw

Internationaux Feminins de la Vienne - Doubles